Swilgate is a cricket ground in Tewkesbury, Gloucestershire.  The first recorded match on the ground was in 1893, when Tewkesbury played Handsworth Wood.

Gloucestershire played 2 List-A matches at the ground, the first of which saw them play Yorkshire in the 1972 John Player League.  The second and final List-A match at the ground came the following season in the same tournament when Gloucestershire played Lancashire.

Gloucestershire Women used the ground in the 2010 Women's County Championship Division Five South and West against Wiltshire Women.  In local domestic cricket, the ground is the home venue of Tewkesbury Cricket Club.

References

External links
Swilgate on CricketArchive
Swilgate on Cricinfo

Cricket grounds in Gloucestershire
Tewkesbury
Sports venues completed in 1893